Philodromidae, also known as  philodromid crab spiders and running crab spiders, is a family of araneomorph spiders first described by Tord Tamerlan Teodor Thorell in 1870 (then known as subfamily Philodrominae within Thomisidae). It contains over 500 species in thirty genera.

The most common genus is Philodromus which is widespread, similar to Ebo. Other common genera include the elongate grass-dwelling Tibellus and the widespread Thanatus, which includes the house crab spider that commonly captures flies on and in buildings.

Description 
Philodromids have a crab-like shape due to the first two pairs of legs being oriented sideways (laterigrade). This is superficially similar to the "true" crab spiders (Thomisidae), such as Misumena vatia, but these families are not as closely related as previously thought. Unlike crab spiders, the legs are generally similar in size, though the second leg pair may be significantly longer than the first pair. This is most evident in Ebo, where the second pair of legs are twice as long as the first pair in some species. Philodromids have scopula only at the tips of the tarsi (unlike sparassids) and the eyes are in two curved rows with the posterior row wider than the anterior row. In terms of colouration, they are usually cream to light brown and have faint longitudinal stripes.

Ecology 
Philodromidae are active predators and often occur on the stems and leaves of plants. Some occur only on deciduous trees and others only on conifers. A small number of species live in deserts. Instead of building webs to catch prey, they hunt by ambush.

Genera

, the World Spider Catalog accepts the following genera:

Apollophanes O. Pickard-Cambridge, 1898 — North America, Asia, Trinidad, Panama, Ecuador
Bacillocnemis Mello-Leitão, 1938 — Argentina
Berlandiella Mello-Leitão, 1929 — Brazil, Argentina
Cleocnemis Simon, 1886 — South America
Ebo Keyserling, 1884 — Asia, North America, Argentina
Eminella Özdikmen, 2007 — Argentina
Fageia Mello-Leitão, 1929 — Brazil
Gephyrellula Strand, 1932 — Brazil
Gephyrina Simon, 1895 — South America, Saint Vincent and the Grenadines
Gephyrota Strand, 1932 — Asia, Africa, Australia
Halodromus Muster, 2009 — Spain, Asia, Africa
Hirriusa Strand, 1932 — Namibia, South Africa
Metacleocnemis Mello-Leitão, 1929 — Brazil
Pagiopalus Simon, 1900 — Hawaii
Paracleocnemis Schiapelli & Gerschman, 1942 — Argentina
Pedinopistha Karsch, 1880 — Hawaii
Petrichus Simon, 1886 — South America
Philodromops Mello-Leitão, 1943 — Brazil
Philodromus Walckenaer, 1826 — North America, Asia, Africa, Oceania, Europe, Caribbean, Central America, Venezuela
Procleocnemis Mello-Leitão, 1929 — Brazil
Psellonus Simon, 1897 — India
Pseudopsellonus Balogh, 1936 — Papua New Guinea
Pulchellodromus Wunderlich, 2012 — Algeria, Europe, Asia
Rhysodromus Schick, 1965 — Asia, North America
Suemus Simon, 1895 — Sierra Leone, Vietnam, South Africa
Thanatus C. L. Koch, 1837 — Africa, Asia, North America, Europe, South America
Tibellus Simon, 1875 — North America, Asia, Africa, South America, Cuba, Italy, Australia
Tibitanus Simon, 1907 — Namibia, Guinea-Bissau, Guinea
Titanebo Gertsch, 1933 — United States, Mexico
Vacchellia Caporiacco, 1935 — Karakorum

incertae sedis
 Euthanatus Petrunkevitch, 1950 † (fossil)
 Filiolella Petrunkevitch, 1955 † (fossil)
 Medela Petrunkevitch, 1942 † (fossil)

See also
 List of Philodromidae species

References

External links

 Platnick, N.I. 2003. World Spider Catalog
 Picture of a philodromid
 Identification of European genera and species

 
Araneomorphae families
Taxa named by Tamerlan Thorell